Irlam railway station in Irlam, Greater Manchester, England, is  west of Manchester Oxford Road on the Manchester to Liverpool Line, and is operated by Northern Trains.

History
The original station, named Irlam, was opened by the Cheshire Lines Committee on 2 September 1873, on their route between Manchester Central and Liverpool Central. The station was renamed Irlam and Cadishead on 1 August 1879.

The construction of the Manchester Ship Canal, which opened on 1 January 1894, required the railway line to be raised in order to provide clearance for shipping, so a new line was built parallel but at a higher level. The new line was used by goods trains from 9 January 1893, and on 26 March 1893 passenger trains were also transferred to the deviation, the original station being closed and replaced by the present station.

In August 1954, the station was renamed Irlam for Cadishead, reverting to Irlam on 6 May 1974.

Facilities
The station is unstaffed, despite being used by over 350,000 passengers a year. The next station on the line, Flixton, is at least partially staffed although its usage is much less.  A ticket machine is now available for use, both for purchasing tickets and collecting ones bought in advance.  Shelters, digital information screens and timetable poster boards are provided on both platforms.  Step-free access is available only on the eastbound side.

After lying derelict for nearly twenty-five years, the station building was renovated and reopened in March 2015. It now serves as a railway-themed cafe, with toilets, a cycle hub, and 60-space car park.

Irlam station is unusual in that the track and platform is the wrong side of the station building on the Manchester side. This is due to the deviation of the line in 1893.

Services

Monday to Saturday services are roughly half-hourly in each direction, towards Glazebrook and Liverpool Lime Street to the west and towards Flixton and Manchester Oxford Road in the east. An express service  evening peak-time period (operated by East Midlands Railway in the evening) makes an additional stop at this station to cater for commuters working in Manchester. 

Since December 2006, trains now serve the station on Sundays. This is the first Sunday service at this station in over twenty years, with an hourly service operating in both directions. City of Salford council has advised locals to use the service or it may be withdrawn.

References

External links

Friends of Irlam Station website

Railway stations in Salford
DfT Category F1 stations
Former Cheshire Lines Committee stations
Railway stations in Great Britain opened in 1873
Railway stations in Great Britain closed in 1893
Railway stations in Great Britain opened in 1893
Railway stations served by East Midlands Railway
Northern franchise railway stations
Railway stations served by TransPennine Express